Ottavio Acquaviva d'Aragona, iuniore (1609–1674) was a Roman Catholic cardinal.

He was Camerlengo of the Sacred College of Cardinals between 1669 and 1671 and he participate in 3 conclaves (1665, 1667 and 1669-1670).

References

1609 births
1674 deaths
17th-century Italian cardinals
Clergy from Naples